Palms is the tenth studio album by American rock band Thrice. The album was released on September 14, 2018, through Epitaph Records, making it the band's first release through the label.

On July 10, the band released a single titled "The Grey" accompanied by a music video directed by Daniel Carberry. A second single from the album, "Only Us", was released August 14. The album was co-produced by the band and Eric Palmquist, and mixed by John Congleton, and is said to encompass everything from "viscerally charged post-hardcore to piano-driven balladry."

On March 1, 2019, the band announced the Deeper Wells EP, consisting of four new tracks recorded during the Palms sessions. It was released on 12" vinyl on April 13, 2019, for Record Store Day.

Track listing

Personnel
 Dustin Kensrue – lead vocals, rhythm guitar, synthesizers, percussion
 Teppei Teranishi – lead guitar, synthesizer, backing vocals, piano, glockenspiel
 Eddie Breckenridge – bass guitar, synthesizer, backing vocals, occasional guitars
 Riley Breckenridge – drums, programming
 Emma Ruth Rundle – backing vocals (track 4)

Charts

References

2018 albums
Thrice albums
Epitaph Records albums